Ramón Ferreñac (1763–1832) was a Spanish composer.

He has been praised for his sonatas for two and four hands by musicologists from the likes of Antonio Lozano and Felip Pedrell.

1763 births
1832 deaths
Spanish composers
Spanish male composers